The 1910–11 Divizia A was the second season of Divizia A, the top-level football league of Romania.

Final table

References

1910-11
1910–11 in European association football leagues
1910–11 in Romanian football